The Goff Homestead is a historic colonial American house at 40 Maple Lane in Rehoboth, Massachusetts.  This -story wood-frame house was built c. 1750–80, and is an extremely rare local example of a Georgian period house with end chimneys (rather than a single central chimney more typical of the time).  The chimney design is particularly idiosyncratic, and is found in Massachusetts in only one other house, also located in Rehoboth.  The house was in the hands of the locally prominent Goff family from 1784 to c. 1920.

The house was listed on the National Register of Historic Places in 1983.

See also
National Register of Historic Places listings in Bristol County, Massachusetts

References

Buildings and structures in Rehoboth, Massachusetts
Houses in Bristol County, Massachusetts
Georgian architecture in Massachusetts
Houses completed in 1750
Houses on the National Register of Historic Places in Bristol County, Massachusetts